Pervomaysk is a town in Nizhny Novgorod Oblast, Russia, located  south of Nizhny Novgorod. Population:    16,000 (1974).

History
Until 1951 the town was known as Tashino.

Administrative and municipal status
Within the framework of administrative divisions, it is, together with one work settlement and forty-three rural localities, incorporated as the town of oblast significance of Pervomaysk—an administrative unit with the status equal to that of the districts. As a municipal division, the town of oblast significance of Pervomaysk is incorporated as Pervomaysk Urban Okrug.

Until July 2012, the town served as the administrative center of Pervomaysky District and, within the framework of administrative divisions, was incorporated as a town of district significance. As a municipal division, it was incorporated as Pervomaysk Urban Settlement within Pervomaysky Municipal District.

Notable residents 

Dmitry Larin (born 1973), football player and manager
Gennady Ulanov (1929–2018), Soviet politician

References

Notes

Sources

Cities and towns in Nizhny Novgorod Oblast
Pervomaysk Urban Okrug